Luis Augusto Martins Côrtes, better known as Lula Côrtes (9 May 1951 – 26 March 2011), was a Brazilian musician, best remembered for his collaboration with Zé Ramalho on the 1975 album Paêbirú. 

He released several albums, including Satwa (1973) and Rosa de Sangue (1980). He worked with Ramalho on other albums including his 1978 debut, Zé Ramalho, De Gosto de Água e de Amigos in 1985 and Cidades e Lendas in 1996.

Death
Lula Côrtes died on 26 March 2011, in Recife, Brazil from  throat cancer at the age of 61.

Discography
1973: Satwa
1975: Paêbirú
1980: Rosa de Sangue
1981: O Gosto Novo da Vida
1988: Bom Shankar Bolenath
1996: Má Companhia
2006: A Vida Não É Sopa

References

1949 births
2011 deaths
20th-century Brazilian male singers
20th-century Brazilian singers
Deaths from esophageal cancer
Deaths from cancer in Pernambuco
People from Recife